The 2020–21 season was the 124th season in the history of Royale Union Saint-Gilloise and the club's sixth consecutive season in the second division of Belgian football.

Players

First-team squad

 (on loan from Brighton)

Transfers

Im

Out

Pre-season and friendlies

Competitions

Overall record

Belgian First Division B

League table

Results summary

Results by round

Matches

Belgian Cup

References

Royale Union Saint-Gilloise seasons
Union SG